John Edward Mayasich (Croatian: Meašić; born May 22, 1933) is an American former ice hockey player of Croatian descent. He was a member of the U.S. ice hockey team that won a silver medal at the 1956 Winter Olympics and a gold medal at the 1960 Winter Olympics. He also played for Team USA at the IIHF World Championships in 1958, 1961, 1962 (when he was voted best defenseman), 1966 and 1969. 

While attending the University of Minnesota, Mayasich set the NCAA tournament record for most points scored in a game with eight against Michigan in 1954. Mayasich won the Western Collegiate Hockey Association scoring title in 1954 and 1955 and was an All-American three years in a row at his university.

Mayasich was inducted into the United States Hockey Hall of Fame in 1976 and the Wisconsin Hockey Hall of Fame in 1989. Number 8 has been retired in his honor by the Minnesota Golden Gophers men's ice hockey program, the only former Golden Gopher to be so honored. In 2011, Mayasich was ranked No 1 on the Minneapolis Star Tribune's list of "Minnesota's 100 Greatest Players in High School Hockey History".

Career
Mayasich was born in Minnesota, to Croatian parents who had immigrated from the former Yugoslavia.

He attended Eveleth High School in Eveleth, Minnesota and participated in a number of sports. During his high school hockey career he set many individual records and helped his team achieve additional team records that stand even today. Among those records are the 46 total points he recorded at numerous state tournament games and helping his team win four consecutive state championships from 1948 to 1951.

Mayasich played on both the 1956 Olympic silver medal team in Cortina d'Ampezzo, Italy and the 1960 Olympic Gold Medal team in Squaw Valley, California.

He is the Minnesota Gophers' all-time leading scorer with 144 goals and 154 assists in 111 games played, an average of about 1.3 goals per game. Mayasich also held scoring records in the high school ranks. While he still holds most state tournament records, a pair of Gophers, Dave Spehar and John Pohl, have since broken his all-time career scoring mark. Coach Doug Woog pointed out, "We drew the parallel with Dave Spehar," Woog said. "He (Spehar) was the most contemporary state tournament phenom; he had three hat tricks. John had seven. His numbers are phenomenal."

Despite his stellar accomplishments in college and international hockey, Mayasich never got any offers to pursue an NHL career. "It wasn't a source of bitterness, since no college players were being given a chance," he later told Sports Illustrated in 1999,"but there's still regret, even to this day, not knowing if I could have done it." Mayasich did briefly play some minor league hockey for the St.Paul Saints and Minneapolis Millers as well as permanently for the amateur Green Bay Bobcats, earning extra money, but his professional career was in the broadcasting industry. After earlier positions, John joined Hubbard Broadcasting, Inc. (St. Paul) as General Manager of KS95 FM, guiding its growth to become  one of the highest  rated major market  FMs in the country.  In 1983, Mayasich was promoted to President of Hubbard's radio division, and served in that position until his retirement in 1997. He has remained active as a consultant to Hubbard.

Awards and honors

See also
 List of members of the United States Hockey Hall of Fame
 List of Croatian Americans

References 

 20 great Minnesotans in hockey by John McGourty, NHL.com. (January 16, 2004)
 U hockey program will retire John Mayasich's number this weekend by Tim Nichols, The Minnesota Daily. (November 13, 1998)

External links
Gopher Hockey History Player Info

1933 births
Living people
AHCA Division I men's ice hockey All-Americans
American men's ice hockey centers
American people of Croatian descent
Ice hockey players from Minnesota
Ice hockey players at the 1956 Winter Olympics
Ice hockey players at the 1960 Winter Olympics
IIHF Hall of Fame inductees
Lester Patrick Trophy recipients
Minnesota Golden Gophers men's ice hockey players
Minneapolis Millers (IHL) players
Medalists at the 1956 Winter Olympics
Medalists at the 1960 Winter Olympics
Olympic gold medalists for the United States in ice hockey
Olympic silver medalists for the United States in ice hockey
Sportspeople from Eveleth, Minnesota
United States Hockey Hall of Fame inductees